The Runaways is a 2018 British film that is set in North Yorkshire, England. The story revolves around three children who embark on a journey to find their mother. The film, which stars Mark Addy and Tara Fitzgerald, was put out on general release in 2019.

Synopsis
Three siblings, Angie (Molly Windsor), Polly (Macy Shackleton) and Ben (Rhys Connah), go on the run from Social Services when their father dies. They are trying to get to the home of their estranged mother. On the way, they take two donkeys with them from the family's beach donkey business.

Cast
Mark Addy
Tara Fitzgerald
Lee Boardman
Molly Windsor
Rhys Connah
Macy Shackleton

Production
Filming took place across the North York Moors, but mostly in the towns of Thirsk and Whitby in North Yorkshire. It was shot over a six-week period in the summer of 2017. Because of that, the film was premiered in Whitby in October 2018. Other filming location included Runswick Bay, and two of the stations on the North York Moors Railway ( and ).

Reception
Izzy Sharp, writing in The MancUnion gave the film four stars out of five, and said that the whilst some of the jokes were clunky, the young actors in the film were to be praised for their performance; "...the acting is wonderful, especially from the young cast". Graham Walker, writing in The Yorkshire Post, described the film as "Dark, Haunting. Atmospheric, Uplifting. Don't miss it."

References

External links
 
 Official website

2018 films
Films set in Yorkshire
Films shot in North Yorkshire
2018 drama films
British children's drama films
2010s English-language films
2010s British films